The role of an Norway national football team manager was first established in 1953 with the appointment of Austrian Willibald Hahn. Prior to 1953, the team was selected by a selection committee, which also continued to select the team until 1969.

Nineteen men have occupied the post since its inception; one of those were in a short-term caretaker manager role: Ragnar Larsen (one game in his first spell). Egil Olsen is the only manager who has qualified for a World Cup; achieving a Round of 16-appearance at the 1998 World Cup as the best result. Nils Johan Semb is the only manager who has qualified for a European Championship. Ragnar Larsen became the first Norwegian manager when he led the team as a caretaker in a match in 1958. His successor, Kristian Henriksen was the first Norwegian to manage the team on a permanent basis. Wilhelm Kment, Larsen (one as caretaker) and Olsen managed Norway on more than one occasion, all with two spells.

Statistical summary
The following table provides a summary of the complete record of each Norway manager including their progress in both the World Cup and the European Championship. Prior to 1953, the squad was selected by a selection committee, which also continued to select the team until 1969.
Statistics correct as of 18 November 2019

Key: P–games played, W–games won, D–games drawn; L–games lost, %–win percentage

Notes

References

Norway

Managers